Manning Library, also known as Clarendon County Public Library and Hannah Levi Memorial Library, is a historic library building located at Manning, Clarendon County, South Carolina. It was built in 1909–1910, and is a one-story, brick, Classical Revival style structure is set on a raised basement. The front façade features a pedimented Roman Doric order portico projecting from the central bay. The library was the first public library in Clarendon County.

It was listed in the National Register of Historic Places in 1979.

References

Libraries on the National Register of Historic Places in South Carolina
Neoclassical architecture in South Carolina
Library buildings completed in 1910
Buildings and structures in Clarendon County, South Carolina
National Register of Historic Places in Clarendon County, South Carolina